Tsunami is a 1981 video game published by Creative Computing Software.

Gameplay
Tsunami is a game in which the player must defend against alien attacks.

Reception
Bob Proctor reviewed the game for Computer Gaming World, stating that: "For those who like "Invader" games, Tsunami will be of great interest due to [its] variety and professional quality."

References

External links
Article in Creative Computing

1981 video games
Alien invasions in video games
Apple II games
Apple II-only games
Fixed shooters
Science fiction video games
Video games developed in the United States
Video games set in outer space